Theodore Roosevelt Dunn (born February 1, 1955) is an American former professional basketball player who was most recently an assistant coach for the Houston Rockets of the National Basketball Association (NBA).

A star at the University of Alabama, Dunn played for coach CM Newton, who would start five black players in a time of racial turbulence and progress.  Center Leon Douglas said, "We knew Coach Newton (signed us) because he wanted to win.  He wasn't trying to be a trailblazer. You have to respect a man for putting five black starters on the court when others said it was a no-no."  On December 28, 1973, in a 65-55 win over the University of Louisville Cardinals, Newton started Douglas, Charles "Boonie" Russell, Charles Cleveland, Dunn and Ray Odums for the first all-black starting line-up in SEC history, and a team that would win the SEC season title.

The 6'4" Dunn was selected by the Portland Trail Blazers in the second round of the 1977 NBA draft.  He went on to have a productive 14-year career with three teams: the Blazers (1977–1980), the Denver Nuggets (1980–1988;1989–1991), and the Phoenix Suns (1988–1989).  Dunn was named to the NBA's All-Defensive Second Team three times during his career, and he was widely regarded as one of the best rebounding guards of the 1980s.

After retiring in 1991 with 5,033 career points and 4,371 career rebounds, Dunn served six seasons (1991–1997) as an assistant coach for the Charlotte Hornets.  He later served brief tenures as head coach of the WNBA's Charlotte Sting and as an assistant coach at the University of Alabama, and in 2004 he was hired as an assistant coach for the NBA's Sacramento Kings. In 2007, he became an assistant coach for the Houston Rockets. On December 6, 2011, he was hired as an assistant coach by the Minnesota Timberwolves to work under Rick Adelman.

NBA career statistics

Regular season

|-
| style="text-align:left;"| 1977-78
| style="text-align:left;"| Portland
| 63 ||  || 12.2 || .417 ||  || .661 || 2.3 || 0.7 || 0.7 || 0.1 || 3.8
|-
| style="text-align:left;"| 1978-79
| style="text-align:left;"| Portland
| 80 ||  || 22.9 || .448 ||  || .772 || 4.3 || 1.3 || 1.1 || 0.3 || 7.7
|-
| style="text-align:left;"| 1979–80
| style="text-align:left;"| Portland
| 82 ||  || 22.5 || .436 || .000 || .757 || 4.0 || 1.8 || 1.2 ||  0.4 || 6.9
|-
| style="text-align:left;"| 1980-81
| style="text-align:left;"| Denver
| 82 ||  || 17.4 || .412 || .000 || .653 || 3.7 || 1.0 || 0.8 || 0.4 || 4.5
|-
| style="text-align:left;"| 1981–82
| style="text-align:left;"| Denver
| 82 || 80 || 30.7 || .512 || .000 || .712 || 6.8 || 2.3 || 1.6 || 0.4 || 8.2
|-
| style="text-align:left;"| 1982–83
| style="text-align:left;"| Denver
| 82 || 80 || 32.2 || .482 || .000 || .730 || 7.5 || 2.3 || 1.8 || 0.3 || 7.6
|-
| style="text-align:left;"| 1983–84
| style="text-align:left;"| Denver
| 82 || 74 || 33.8 || .512 || .000 || .731 || 7.2 || 2.9 || 2.2 || 0.4 || 5.7
|-
| style="text-align:left;"| 1984–85
| style="text-align:left;"| Denver
| 81 || 81 || 28.3 || .489 || .000 || .724 || 4.8 || 1.9 || 1.7 || 0.2 || 5.4
|-
| style="text-align:left;"| 1985–86
| style="text-align:left;"| Denver
| 82 || 82 || 29.3 || .454 || .000 || .773 || 4.6 || 2.1 || 1.9 || 0.2 || 5.0
|-
| style="text-align:left;"| 1986–87
| style="text-align:left;"| Denver
| 81 || 53 || 23.9 || .428 || .000 || .655 || 3.3 || 1.8 || 1.2 || 0.3 || 3.4
|-
| style="text-align:left;"| 1987–88
| style="text-align:left;"| Denver
| 82 || 1 || 18.7 || .449 || .000 || .769 || 2.9 || 1.1 || 1.2 || 0.1 || 2.2
|-
| style="text-align:left;"| 1988–89
| style="text-align:left;"| Phoenix
| 34 || 1 || 9.4 || .343 ||  || .750 || 1.8 || 0.7 || 0.4 || 0.0 || 1.0
|-
| style="text-align:left;"| 1989–90
| style="text-align:left;"| Denver
| 65 || 2 || 10.1 || .454 || .000 || .667 || 2.1 || 0.7 || 0.6 || 0.1 || 1.8
|-
| style="text-align:left;"| 1990-91
| style="text-align:left;"| Denver
| 17 || 3 || 12.8 || .447 || .250 || .900 || 2.5 || 1.4 || 0.7 || 0.1 || 3.1
|- class="sortbottom"
| style="text-align:center;" colspan=2| Career
| 993 || 457 || 23.2 || .457 || .059 || .725 || 4.4 || 1.6 || 1.3 || 0.3 || 5.1

Playoffs

|-
| style="text-align:left;"| 1978
| style="text-align:left;"| Portland
| 10 ||  || 8.8 || .500 ||  ||  || 1.3 || 0.8 || 0.3 || 0.0 || 1.0
|-
| style="text-align:left;"| 1979
| style="text-align:left;"| Portland
| 3 ||  || 17.3 || .686 ||  ||  || 2.0 || 1.3 || 0.3 || 0.0 || 3.3
|-
| style="text-align:left;"| 1980
| style="text-align:left;"| Portland
| 3 ||  || 8.0 || .250 ||  || 1.000 || 1.3 || 1.3 || 0.3 || 0.0 || 2.0
|-
| style="text-align:left;"| 1982
| style="text-align:left;"| Denver
| 3 ||  || 27.0 || .462 ||  || .875 || 6.0 || 3.3 || 2.7 || 0.3 || 6.3
|-
| style="text-align:left;"| 1983
| style="text-align:left;"| Denver
| 8 ||  || 37.5 || .439 ||  || .625 || 9.8 || 2.5 || 1.5 || 0.4 || 5.1
|-
| style="text-align:left;"| 1984
| style="text-align:left;"| Denver
| 5 ||  || 35.6 || .560 ||  || .714 || 7.8 || 1.6 || 2.0 || 0.8 || 6.6
|-
| style="text-align:left;"| 1985
| style="text-align:left;"| Denver
| 15 || 15 || 24.7 || .415 ||  || .737 || 4.0 || 2.3 || 1.6 || 0.2 || 4.5
|-
| style="text-align:left;"| 1986
| style="text-align:left;"| Denver
| 10 || 10 || 27.6 || .435 ||  || .643 || 5.3 || 1.3 || 1.6 || 0.0 || 4.9
|-
| style="text-align:left;"| 1987
| style="text-align:left;"| Denver
| 3 || 0 || 7.3 || .250 ||  ||  || 1.0 || 0.8 || 0.3 || 0.3 || 0.7
|-
| style="text-align:left;"| 1988
| style="text-align:left;"| Denver
| 11 || 3 || 16.8 || .550 ||  || .500 || 2.6 || 0.3 || 0.7 || 0.0 || 2.4
|-
| style="text-align:left;"| 1989
| style="text-align:left;"| Phoenix
| 8 || 0 || 9.9 || .429 ||  || .500 || 1.9 || 0.1 || 0.6 || 0.0 || 0.9
|-
| style="text-align:left;"| 1990
| style="text-align:left;"| Denver
| 3 || 0 || 10.3 ||  ||  ||  || 2.3 || 0.7 || 1.3 || 0.3 || 0.0
|- class="sortbottom"
| style="text-align:center;" colspan=2| Career
| 76 || 28 || 21.5 || .447 ||  || .691 || 4.2 || 1.4 || 1.3 || 0.2 || 3.5

See also
List of National Basketball Association single-game steals leaders

References

External links
 

1955 births
Living people
African-American basketball players
Alabama Crimson Tide men's basketball coaches
Alabama Crimson Tide men's basketball players
American men's basketball coaches
American men's basketball players
American women's basketball coaches
Basketball coaches from Alabama
Basketball players from Birmingham, Alabama
Charlotte Hornets assistant coaches
Charlotte Sting coaches
Denver Nuggets assistant coaches
Denver Nuggets players
Houston Rockets assistant coaches
Minnesota Timberwolves assistant coaches
Parade High School All-Americans (boys' basketball)
Phoenix Suns players
Portland Trail Blazers draft picks
Portland Trail Blazers players
Sacramento Kings assistant coaches
Shooting guards
Small forwards
Sportspeople from Birmingham, Alabama
21st-century African-American people
20th-century African-American sportspeople